This is a timeline of the Warring States period (481 BC to 403) and the Qin state (9th century BC–221 BC) and dynasty (221 BC–206 BC).

9th century BC

8th century BC

7th century BC

6th century BC

5th century BC

4th century BC

3rd century BC

Gallery

See also
 Timeline of the Chu–Han Contention

Citations

Bibliography

 Li, Xiaobing, ed. China at War: An Encyclopedia. Santa Barbara: ABC-CLIO, 2012. online

Warring States and the Qin dynasty